A total solar eclipse occurred on May 30, 1965. A solar eclipse occurs when the Moon passes between Earth and the Sun, thereby totally or partly obscuring the image of the Sun for a viewer on Earth. A total solar eclipse occurs when the Moon's apparent diameter is larger than the Sun's, blocking all direct sunlight, turning day into darkness. Totality occurs in a narrow path across Earth's surface, with the partial solar eclipse visible over a surrounding region thousands of kilometres wide. Totality was visible from northwestern Northland Region in New Zealand on May 31st (Monday), and Manuae in Cook Islands, Manuae and Motu One in French Polynesia, and Peru on May 30th (Sunday).

Related eclipses

Solar eclipses of 1964–1967

Saros 127

Inex series

Metonic series

References

External links

Russia expedition for solar eclipse of May 30, 1965 

1965 05 30
1965 in science
1965 05 30
May 1965 events